Tom Kling-Baptiste (born 29 August 1990 in Sundsvall) is a Swedish athlete competing in sprinting events. He represented his country at the 2014 World Indoor Championships without advancing from the first round.

International competitions

Personal bests
Outdoor
100 metres – 10.29 (+1.4 m/s, Skara 2014)
200 metres – 20.81 (+1.6 m/s, Söderhamn 2015)
Indoor
60 metres – 6.65 (Gothenburg 2014)
200 metres – 21.07 (Växjö 2016)

References

1990 births
Living people
Swedish male sprinters
People from Sundsvall
Competitors at the 2015 Summer Universiade
Sportspeople from Västernorrland County
21st-century Swedish people